The bahay kubo, also known as payag (Nipon) in the Visayan languages and, is a type of stilt house indigenous to the Philippines. It often serves as an icon of Philippine culture. The house is exclusive to the lowland population of unified Spanish conquered territories. Its design heavily influenced the colonial-era bahay na bato architecture.

Etymology

The Filipino term báhay kúbo roughly means "country house", from Tagalog. The term báhay ("house") is derived from Proto-Malayo-Polynesian *balay, "public building" or "community house"; while the term kúbo ("hut" or "[one-room] country hut") is from Proto-Malayo-Polynesian *kubu, "field hut [in rice fields]".

The term "nipa hut", introduced during the Philippines' American colonial era, refers to the Hut version of Bahay kubo.  Nipa or anahaw thatching materials are often used for the roofs. However, not all bahay kubo are huts or used nipa materials.

History

Classical period (Pre-hispanic Era)

Distinction between each tribes and cultures' style may have been more visible during the pre-hispanic period. Different architectural designs are present among each ethnolinguistic group in what is now the Philippines and throughout the Southeast Asia and Pacific as part of the whole Austronesian Architecture. They were designed to endure the climate and environment of the Philippines. These structures were temporary, made from plant materials like bamboo. The accessibility of the materials made it easier to rebuild when damaged by a storm or earthquake.

Hispanic Era
The advent of the Spanish Colonial era introduced the idea of building more permanent communities with the church and government center as focal points. Christianized people such as the Tagalogs, Visayans, Ilocanos, Kapampangans, Bicolanos, Cagayanons, Mestizos, Criollos, Chinese and Japanese etc. were made to live lowland, this newly formed culture, with most population coming from Austronesian origin, each having their own distinct traditions of Austronesian architecture, dating back even before the Hispanic period, collectively evolved a certain style of construction that has become synonymous to the lowland culture based on the Austronesian architecture. These houses, are now known as the Bahay kubo. Appearance varies from simple huts, later known by the Americans as Nipa huts, to mansions like Bahay na bato. Architectural Designs and ornamentations varies from From standard, Chinese, Americas, European to eclectic . The new community also setup made construction using heavier, more permanent materials desirable. Some of these materials included bricks, mortar, tiles and stone. Finding European construction styles impractical in local conditions, Spanish and Filipino builders quickly adapted the characteristics of the bahay kubo and combined it with Spanish architectural style.

Bahay na bato

Bahay na bato or Casa Filipino is a noble version of bahay kubo with mainly Spanish and Chinese influence. Its design evolved throughout the ages but maintained its nipa hut architectural roots. Its most common appearance is like that of stilt nipa hut that stands on Spanish style stone blocks or bricks as a foundation instead of wood or bamboo stilts.

The bahay na bato, followed the nipa hut's arrangements such as open ventilation and elevated apartments. It was popular among the elite or middle class and integrated the characteristics of the nipa hut with the style, culture, and technology of Spanish architecture. The most obvious difference between the two houses would be the materials that was used to build them. The bahay na bato was constructed out of brick and stone rather than the traditional bamboo materials. It is a mixture of native Filipino, Spanish and Chinese influences. During the 19th century, wealthy Filipinos built some fine houses, usually with solid stone foundations or brick lower walls, and overhanging, wooden upper story/stories with balustrades Ventanillas and capiz shell sliding windows, and a Chinese tiled roof or sometimes Nipa roof which are today being replaced by galvanized roof. Bahay na bato had a rectangular plan that reflected the Hispano-American Antillean architectural style integrated with traditional Philippine style. Today these houses are more commonly called ancestral houses.

Characteristics

It is originally and is still typical for Bahay kubo to be mostly organic in material and be elevated, mainly for vernacular and superstitious reasons and because of floods during wet season and the hot dry land during summer can cause a lot of problems for the inhabitants. Similar conditions in Philippine lowland areas have led to characteristics "typical" of examples of Bahay Kubo.  
With few exceptions arising only in modern times, most Bahay Kubo are on stilts: the living area is accessed by ladder. This naturally divides the house into three areas: the living area in the middle, the area beneath it (referred to in Tagalog as the silong), and the roof space (bubungan), which may or may not be separated from the living area by a ceiling (atip).

Bubong (Roof)
The traditional roof shape of the Bahay Kubo is tall and steeply pitched, ending in long eaves. A tall roof creates space above the living area through which warm air could rise, giving the Bahay Kubo a natural cooling effect even during the hot summer season. The steep pitch allows water to flow down quickly at the height of the monsoon season while the long eaves give people a limited space to move about around the house's exterior when it rains. The steep pitch of the roofs are often used to explain why many Bahay Kubo survived the ash fall from the Mt. Pinatubo eruption, when more ’modern’ houses collapsed from the weight of the ash.

Silong
Raised up on hardwood stilts which serve as the main posts of the house, Bahay Kubo have a silong (the Tagalog word also means "shadow") area under the living space for a number of reasons, the most important of which are to create a buffer area for rising waters during floods and to prevent pests such as rats from getting up to the living area. This section of the house is often used for storage, and sometimes for raising farm animals, and thus may or may not be fenced off.

Silid (Living Space)
The main living area is designed to let in as much fresh air and natural light as possible. Smaller Bahay Kubo will often have bamboo slat floors which allow cool air to flow into the living space from the silong below (in which case the silong is not usually used for items which produce strong smells) A Bahay Kubo may be built without an atip (ceiling) so that hot air can rise straight into the large area just beneath the roof and out through strategically placed vents.

Dingding (Walls)

The walls are always of light material such as wood, bamboo rods, or bamboo mats called "amakan" (or "sawali"). As such, they tend to let some coolness flow naturally through them during hot times and keep warmth in during the cold wet season.

The cube shape distinctive of the Bahay Kubo arises from the fact that it is easiest to pre-build the walls and then attach them to the wooden stilt-posts that serve as the corners of the house. The construction of a Bahay Kubo is therefore usually modular, with the wooden stilts established first, a floor frame built next, then wall frames, and finally, the roof.

Dungawan (Windows)

Bahay kubo are typically built with large windows, to let in more air and natural light. The most traditional are large awning windows, held open by a wooden rod. Sliding windows are also common, made either with plain wood or with wooden Capiz shell frames which allow some light to enter the living area even with the windows closed. In more recent decades inexpensive jalousie windows became common.

In larger examples, the large upper windows may be augmented with smaller windows called ventanillas (Spanish for "little window") underneath, which can be opened for ventilation to let in additional air on especially hot days.

Batalan
Some Bahay Kubo, especially those built for long-term residences, feature a batalan ("wet area") distinct from other sections of the house — usually jutting out somewhat from one of the walls. Sometimes at the same level as the living area and sometimes at ground level, the batalan can contain any combination of cooking and dishwashing area, bathing area and, in some cases, a lavatory.

Batalan used for cooking and washing dishes were known as banggéra in Philippine Spanish (also banggerahan or pinganan). It is named after the banga earthen water-jars which are placed on a jutting structure of spaced bamboo or wooden slats.

Kamalig

A granary detached from the house where harvested rice is kept.

Construction materials
The walls of the living area are made of light materials. Posts, walls, and floors are typically made of wood or bamboo and other light materials. The thatched roof is often made of nipa, anahaw or some other locally plentiful plant. Thus, making it easier for the nipa huts to be moved if needed.

Cultural significance
A nipa hut is an icon of Philippine culture as it represents the Filipino value of bayanihan, which refers to a spirit of communal unity or effort to achieve an objective.

Arts
A famous folk song Bahay Kubo often sung in schools which mentions a small house surrounded by vegetables goes like this:

It is a very cultural but misleading song as not all Bahay kubo are small and surrounded by vegetables. Some early and original variants are even palace or mansion like and used by native royalties or in the colonial era used by Captains and governors. Some original mosque and churches in the Philippines are even in Nipa hut style.

Legacy
 American architect and engineer William Le Baron Jenney visited the Philippines for three months in 1850. He noticed that during a storm, the Nipa Hut structures are very "light and flexible". It only dances and sways through the storm. This inspired him to copy the flexibility of the frame of the Nipa hut. In 1879, he built the first lighter building. And in 1884, he built the Home Insurance Building in Chicago, the first metal-framed skyscraper in United States. Because of this, he became known as "The Father of Modern American Skyscrapers", which became the model of all the modern skyscrapers in the world. 

The bahay kubo inspired architects such as Francisco Mañosa and Leandro Locsin by incorporating elements of the bahay na bato into their own designs e.g. Cultural Center of the Philippines, National Arts Center, Coconut Palace, and Light Rail Transit stations.

Similar architecture
Bahay kubo is an example of Austronesian architecture. Other examples of native Austronesian architecture in the Philippines also include structures like the fayu and katyufong of Bontoc; bale and abong of Ifugao; binayon of Kalinga; binangiyan of Kankanai; jin-jin of Ivatan; baley of the Matigsalug; binanwa of Ata; bolloy of Klata; baoy of Ovu-Manuvo; bale of the Bagobo Tagabawa; bong-gumne of Blaan; uyaanan of Mansaka; gunu-bong of T'boli; lawig, mala-a-walai, langgal, lamin and torogan of the Maranao; bay-sinug of Tausug; lumah of Yakan; and others.

See also
 Ancestral houses of the Philippines
 Architecture of the Philippines
 Kawayan Torogan
 Las Casas Filipinas de Acuzar
 Torogan
 Rumah Melayu
 Rumah adat
 Vernacular architecture

References

External links

 Eight minute video of building a modern Nipa hut

Houses in the Philippines
Huts
Stilt houses
Wooden buildings and structures in the Philippines
Vernacular architecture